Beat Music! Beat Music! Beat Music! is a studio album by Mark Guiliana, released April 12, 2019 on Motéma Music. The album received a Grammy Award nomination for Best Contemporary Instrumental Album.

References

2019 albums